Enhypen (Enhaipun; stylized in all caps) is a South Korean boy band formed by Belift Lab, a joint venture between CJ ENM and Hybe Corporation, through the 2020 survival competition show I-Land. The group is composed of seven members: Heeseung, Jay, Jake, Sunghoon, Sunoo, Jungwon, and Ni-ki. They debuted on November 30, 2020, with the extended play (EP) Border: Day One.

Name
The group's name, Enhypen, was introduced during the live broadcast of the final episode of I-Land. Etymologically, Enhypen derives its name from the hyphen symbol (-), representing "Connection, Discovery, & Growth". Similar to how a hyphen connects different words to create new meanings, Enhypen aims "to come together to connect, discover and grow together to form a new act".

Career

Pre-debut activities and formation through I-Land

In March 2019, Belift Lab (Belift) was co-founded by South Korean entertainment agencies CJ E&M and Hybe Corporation, with plans to create a new band in 2020. Auditions commenced the same month in Seoul, the United States, Taiwan, and Japan, among others locations, seeking male trainees born between 1997 and 2008. On May 8, 2020, television channel Mnet announced the survival competition series I-Land, as part of the joint venture between the two entertainment companies that "follows the process of next generation K-pop artists being born". Enhypen was formed through the show, which featured 23 male trainees, some of whom were originally from Belift's auditions, while others transferred from Big Hit Music to Belift. The show aired weekly on Mnet from June 26 to September 18, 2020, and internationally on Hybe Labels' YouTube channel. The series was split into two parts, with the top twelve contestants from the first part advancing to the second. On the last episode of the show, seven members were selected out of the nine final contestants, with six chosen by global rankings and one by the producer's choice. The final lineup of Heeseung, Jay, Jake, Sunghoon, Sunoo, Jungwon, and Ni-ki was announced on the live television broadcast of the finale.

2020–2021: Debut with Border: Day One, second extended play, and first studio album
On October 22, 2020, a trailer titled "Choose-Chosen" was posted to Enhypen's YouTube channel, announcing the group's debut in November 2020. A second trailer titled "Dusk-Dawn" was released three days later, followed by a pair of concept mood boards on October 27. On October 28, Belift announced that Enhypen would release their debut extended play (EP) Border: Day One on November 30.  Ahead of their debut, the group accumulated over one million followers on social media platforms, simultaneously across TikTok, Twitter, YouTube, Instagram, and V Live. On November 4, the group amassed over 150,000 pre-orders within two days, and pre-orders had surpassed 300,000 copies by November 21. The EP and lead single "Given-Taken" were released on November 30, accompanied by a live showcase promotion. On December 4, Enhypen officially made their debut on KBS' Music Bank, where the band performed "Given-Taken".

Border: Day One charted at number 39 on the Japanese Oricon 2020 Yearly Album Chart and at number two on the South Korean Gaon Album Chart, having sold 318,528 copies in one day domestically and becoming the highest-selling album by a K-pop group that debuted in 2020. Within two weeks of their debut, the band won Next Leader Award at the 2020 The Fact Music Awards.

In February 2021, Border: Day One received a platinum certification from the Korea Music Content Association (KMCA), the group's first certification in the country. On March 25, 2021, Belift announced that Enhypen would make their comeback at the end of April. A trailer titled "Intro: The Invitation" was released on April 5, announcing their second extended play Border: Carnival. The EP was released in conjunction with its lead single "Drunk-Dazed". On April 8, it was announced that the album pre-orders had surpassed 370,000 copies in three days. By the day before its release, album pre-orders surpassed 450,000 copies.

On May 4, 2021, the group received their first ever music show win on SBS MTV's The Show with "Drunk-Dazed", followed by wins on Show Champion and Music Bank. Their second extended play, Border: Carnival, debuted at number one on the Oricon Albums Chart, the group's first chart-topper in Japan, with over 83,000 copies sold. On May 25, Border: Carnival debuted at number 18 on the US Billboard 200 chart. It also debuted at number nine in World Albums, number four in Top Album Sales, number four in Top Current Album Sales, and number six in Tastemaker Albums. In addition, Enhypen made their first appearance at number 18 on the Billboard Artist 100 chart, and "Drunk-Dazed" entered at number three in World Digital Song Sales.

On July 6, 2021, Enhypen made their Japanese debut with the single , which includes the track "Forget Me Not" that served as the opening theme for the anime Re-Main and the Japanese versions of "Given-Taken" and "Let Me In (20 Cube)". On July 29, Enhypen collaborated with the computer-animated television series Tayo the Little Bus, remaking the theme song "Hey Tayo" and releasing a new song entitled "Billy Poco".

On August 25, 2021, Belift confirmed that Enhypen would make their comeback at the end of September. On September 2, Belift announced that members Heeseung, Jay, Jake, Sunghoon, and Jungwon were tested positive for COVID-19; On September 5, member Ni-ki also tested positive. On September 16, Belift announced they had recovered and that their first studio album, Dimension: Dilemma, was set to be released on October 12, with a trailer titled "Intro: Whiteout" released on September 17. On September 23, it was announced that the album pre-orders had surpassed 600,000 copies in six days. By October 7, pre-orders had surpassed 910,000 copies. Following the release on October 12, the album placed first on the Oricon Album Chart in Japan and Gaon Album Chart in Korea.

On October 19, 2021, the group received their fourth music show win on SBS MTV's The Show with "Tamed-Dashed". This was followed by wins on Show Champion and Music Bank. On October 25, Dimension: Dilemma debuted at number 11 on the Billboard 200, surpassing their previous peak from Border: Carnival. In addition, Enhypen also entered Billboard Artist 100 at number 12. As of November 2021, the group's first studio album has surpassed over 1.1 million copies sold on the Gaon charts, making it their first-ever million-selling album, and was certified as such by KMCA in December.

On December 9, 2021, Belift had confirmed that Enhypen would make a comeback on January 10, 2022, with the release of Dimension: Answer, a repackaged version of their first studio album Dimension: Dilemma. On December 20, the label also confirmed that in February Enhypen would release the original Japanese song "Always" as the theme for the NTV drama Muchaburi! I will be the president, which would air beginning on January 12, 2022.

2022–present: Dimension: Answer, second Japanese single, and Manifesto: Day 1 
On January 8, 2022, it was revealed that pre-orders for Dimension: Answer had surpassed 630,000 copies. On January 19, the group received their seventh music show win on MBC M's Show Champion with "Blessed-Cursed", followed by a win on Music Bank on the January 21. The track became the group's first song to peak at number one on Gaon Download Chart, while the album peaked at number one on both the Gaon Album Chart and Oricon Albums Chart, making it Enhypen's third consecutive album to top the Japanese charts. It was announced on January 20 that the group earned the most entries of all acts on Billboard's Hot Trending Songs Weekly, with six songs. The group also earned their third top 20 entry on the Billboard 200, with Dimension: Answer charting at number 13, and their third consecutive number one on Billboard World Albums.

On January 16, the first of a new fictional webtoon series about the group was released, titled Dark Moon: The Blood Altar.

On February 11, Belift announced that member Sunoo tested positive for COVID-19. On February 15, Belift announced Sunoo had fully recovered and ended quarantine, resuming activities on February 16.

The Japanese digital single "Always" was released on February 22, 2022. It later featured on the tracklist of Enhypen's second Japanese single , which was made available for pre-order beginning on February 22. The single was released on May 3 and also included Japanese versions of "Tamed-Dashed" and "Drunk-Dazed". "Tamed-Dashed" became the group's first number-one on the Billboard Japan Hot 100, with 386,142 units sold in the first week. The single became Enhypen's first Japan album to exceed 300,000 copies sold according to Oricon, making Enhypen the fifth K-pop act to achieve this within one week of release.

On June 14, Belift announced that Enhypen would be releasing their third extended play, Manifesto: Day 1 on July 4, with a trailer titled "Walk the Line" released on the same day. The EP became their second million-selling album and made them the fastest K-pop group to achieve two such albums. On July 12, the group received their ninth music show win on SBS MTV's The Show with "Future Perfect (Pass the Mic)", followed by wins on Show Champion and Music Bank.

In July 2022, it was announced that Enhypen would be embarking on their first world tour starting in September 2022 in Seoul and ending in Japan in November. It was also confirmed that on August 12, they would release the original song "I Need The Light (구해줘)" as the theme for the Playlist and Naver NOW drama Mimicus, which would air beginning on July 22.

On July 21, Belift announced that member Jay tested positive for COVID-19; the same day, the label confirmed that member Jake also tested positive. On July 22, Belift confirmed that member Heeseung also tested positive for COVID-19. On July 27, Belift announced Jay and Jake had fully recovered and ended quarantine, resuming their activities on the same day. On July 28, the label confirmed Heeseung also fully recovered and ended quarantine, resuming his activities on the same day.

On August 12, Esquire Korea officially announced that Enhypen would be on the cover of its September 2022 issue.

On August 15, Belift announced that member Sunoo was would not participate in the last fan signing event on the same day due to health issues. Two days later on August 17, it was announced Sunoo would not be able to fly to Los Angeles for the group's performance at KCON. Major League Baseball team Los Angeles Dodgers announced on August 18 that Enhypen would throw out the ceremonial first pitch at their game against Miami Marlins at Dodger Stadium in Los Angeles, California on August 19.

On August 24, Belift announced that member Sunoo had recovered and would resume his activities on the same day.

On August 27, the teaser for "One in a Billion", for the official soundtrack of the webtoon Dark Moon: The Blood Altar, was released; the song premiered on September 3, and the music video and digital single were officially released on September 6.

On October 18, was announced that Enhypen's first world tour would be extended for January-February 2023 with concerts in Philippines and Thailand. On October 26, Enhypen's first Japanese studio album Sadame was released with 9 tracks, including the Japanese songs "Always" and "Forget Me Not", the Japanese versions of "Blessed-Cursed" and "Future Perfect (Pass the Mic)" and "Polaroid Love" as a bonus track (only for CD) through Universal Music Japan. It also contains the original Japanese song "Make the Change" that has been selected as a theme song for the 2nd season of the Tokai TV and Fuji TV Japanese drama Saikou no Obahan Nakajima Haruko, which began airing on October 8. The Japanese OST was digitally pre-released on October 12.

On November 16, was announced that two more concerts in Japan were added to Enhypen's world tour at Kyocera Dome. On November 28, the song "Zero Moment", sung by members Heeseung, Jay and Jake, was released as a part of the theme songs for the ENA and Genie TV Korean drama Summer Strike, which began airing since November 21.

Members

 Heeseung (희승)
 Jay (제이)
 Jake (제이크)
 Sunghoon (성훈)
 Sunoo (선우)
 Jungwon (정원) — Leader
 Ni-ki (니키)

Endorsements 
In June 2021, Enhypen collaborated with a football-inspired lifestyle brand GOALSTUDIO on limited edition recovery slippers called "En-Grab-Ity Balance" sold on Weverse Shop. In the same month, the group was announced as the first global ambassadors of the French fashion brand Ami Paris. In October, Enhypen was announced as the new global model of Abib, a new Korean skincare brand.

In March 2022, Enhypen was appointed by Japanese footwear company ABC-Mart to be the face of its Nike Air Max promotions that year, including special benefits such as AR experiences and original stickers to those who purchase the INTRLK and EXCEE shoes via its online store. The group later modelled the Nike Oneonta Sandal and Air Rift for summer promotions, and then endorsed Nike Manoa Leather Boots for Winter. In May, the group was chosen as the 2022 Coke Summer campaign artist for its "Coke x Music. Engrave the Magic of Summer" message, covering British rock band Queen's "A Kind of Magic" from their 1986 album of the same name on June 8 through Coke Studio. This was followed by their campaign for "Coca-Cola Zero x ENHYPEN" in August. At the beginning of October, Enhypen has been revealed as the face of BYS Cosmetics Philippines "You Play You" campaign. They were selected as the new ambassador for Kolon Sports in the same month where they modelled its 2022 Fall/Winter Collection and 2023 Spring/Summer Trekking Look Collection.

Discography

Korean albums 
 Dimension: Dilemma (2021)

Japanese albums 
 Sadame (2022)

Filmography

Television

Online shows

Radio

Concerts and tours

1st World Tour "MANIFESTO" (2022–2023)

Fanmeeting

Concert participation
 2021 New Year's Eve Live presented by Weverse
 2022 Weverse Con [New Era]
 2022 KPOP.Flex in Germany
 2023 KROSS vol.2
 2023 We Bridge Music Festival & Expo in Las Vegas

Awards and nominations

Notes

References

External links

Enhypen
2020 establishments in South Korea
K-pop music groups
Musical groups established in 2020
Musical groups from Seoul
South Korean boy bands
South Korean dance music groups
South Korean pop music groups
Hybe Corporation artists
Singing talent show winners
MAMA Award winners
Melon Music Award winners
Japanese-language singers of South Korea